Shane Williams is a Welsh rugby union player who appeared 87 times for the Wales national team from 2000 to 2011. Playing exclusively as a wing for Wales, Williams scored 58 tries, the most for any Wales international and 18 more than second-placed Gareth Thomas. Williams also made four appearances for the British & Irish Lions, three as a wing and one as a centre. Williams scored two tries for the Lions, both from the wing during their victory over South Africa (also known as the 'Springboks') in the third Test of their 2009 tour of South Africa.

Williams made his international debut on 5 February 2000 against France in the opening round of the 2000 Six Nations Championship at Millennium Stadium in Cardiff. His first try for Wales came in the next round of the Six Nations against Italy, also at Millennium Stadium. Williams went on to score tries in the 2003, 2007 and 2011 editions of the World Cup. His final try for Wales came literally at the end of his international career, as he scored on the final play of his last Test on 3 December 2011 against Australia at Millennium Stadium. This try was his 28th at Millennium Stadium, surpassing Rory Underwood of England, with 27 at Twickenham, for the most international tries scored by a player from one of the ten "Tier 1" nations at a single ground. Among players from all nations, Williams is level with Ohata, who scored 28 tries at Chichibunomiya Rugby Stadium in Tokyo.

Williams holds several other try records, both for Wales and internationally. His 30 tries away from his home country (including those at neutral sites) were the most for any player in history at the time of his retirement, though that record has since been broken by Habana. He leads Wales in tries at home (30), away (21), on neutral ground (7), and in the Rugby World Cup (10). Williams was most prolific against Italy, Japan and Scotland, scoring nine tries against each team; he retired with the record for most tries by an opposing player against each of these nations. He also retired with the most tries by any European player against both Australia (6) and South Africa (5). All of his tries against the Springboks were on South African soil, which at the time of his retirement tied him with New Zealanders Christian Cullen and Joe Rokocoko for the most overall. His six tries against Argentina left him level with France's Serge Blanco and Émile Ntamack for the most by a European player.

Williams has scored multiple tries in a single international match on 14 occasions, including two hat-tricks. The first of these was a four-try effort against Japan at Kintetsu Hanazono Rugby Stadium in Osaka during a 2001 Wales tour. The second was against Argentina at José Amalfitani Stadium in Buenos Aires during Wales' 2004 tour. Williams scored tries against 14 countries, including all of the other nine "Tier 1" nations.

Key
 Won denotes that the match was won by the side for which Williams was playing.
 Lost denotes that the match was lost by the side for which Williams was playing.
 Drawn denotes that the match was drawn.
  denotes tries that were scored while playing for the British & Irish Lions.

International tries

References 

Shane
International tries by Williams, Shane
International tries by Williams, Shane